The West Midlands Metro (originally named Midland Metro) is a light-rail/tram system in the county of West Midlands, England. Opened on 30 May 1999, it currently consists of a single route, Line 1, which operates between the cities of Birmingham and Wolverhampton via the towns of Bilston, West Bromwich and Wednesbury, running on a mixture of reopened disused railway line (the Birmingham Snow Hill to Wolverhampton Low Level Line) and on-street running in urban areas. The line originally terminated at Birmingham Snow Hill station but, with extensions opened in 2015, 2019 and 2022, now runs via Birmingham city centre to terminate at Edgbaston. A further extension in Wolverhampton was scheduled to open in 2022, but has been pushed back to 2023, although this date seems unlikely.

The system is owned by the public body Transport for West Midlands, and operated through Midland Metro Ltd, a company wholly owned by the West Midlands Combined Authority.

An extension to Wolverhampton railway station is scheduled to open in spring 2023. Construction of a new Line 2 & 3 from Wednesbury to Brierley Hill was approved in March 2019, started in February 2020 and was intended to be completed for the 2022 Commonwealth Games. However, delays in construction of the extension due to COVID-19 have delayed the project. A further extension will create a new Line 4 from Edgbaston to Curzon Street, Digbeth, Solihull or Chelmsley Wood and Birmingham Airport planned to open in phases in 2023 and 2024–2026 depending on when planning permission is accepted.

History
Birmingham once had an extensive tram network run by Birmingham Corporation Tramways. However, as in most British cities, the network was wound down and closed by the local authority, with the last tram running in 1953.

1984 proposals
There had been proposals for a light rail or Metro system in Birmingham and the Black Country put forward as early as the 1950s and 1960s, ironically at a time when some of the region's lines and services were beginning to be cut back. However, serious inquiry into the possibility started in 1981 when the West Midlands County Council and the West Midlands Passenger Transport Executive formed a joint planning committee to look at light rail as a means of solving the conurbation's congestion problems. In the summer of 1984 they produced a report entitled "Rapid Transit for the West Midlands" which set out ambitious proposals for a £500 million network of ten light rail routes which would be predominantly street running, but would include some underground sections in Birmingham city centre. One of the proposed routes would have used part of the existing line as far as West Bromwich.

The scheme suffered from several drawbacks, one being that three of the proposed routes, from Birmingham to Sutton Coldfield, Shirley, and Dorridge would take over existing railways, and would have included the conversion into a tramway of the Cross-City Line, between Aston and Blake Street, ending direct rail services to Lichfield. The northern section of the North Warwickshire Line was also to be converted as far as Shirley station, leaving a question mark over existing train services to Stratford-upon-Avon. Tram tracks would also run alongside the existing line to Solihull and Dorridge, with local train services ended.

The most serious drawback however, which proved fatal to the scheme, was that the first proposed route of the network, between Five Ways and Castle Bromwich via the city centre would have involved the demolition of 238 properties. This invoked strong opposition from local residents. The scheme was spearheaded by Wednesfield Labour councillor Phil Bateman, but was eventually abandoned in late 1985 in the face of public opposition, and the Transport Executive was unable to find a Member of Parliament willing to sponsor an enabling Bill.

1988 proposals

Following the abolition of the West Midlands County Council and establishment of a new Passenger Transport Authority in 1986, a new light-rail scheme under the name "Midland Metro" was revived with a different set of lines. The first of up to 15 lines was intended to be operating by the end of 1993, and a network of 200 kilometres was planned to be in use by 2000.

In February 1988, it was announced that the first route, Line 1, would be between Birmingham and Wolverhampton, using much of the mothballed trackbed of the former Birmingham Snow Hill to Wolverhampton Low Level Line, a route not included in the 1984 recommended network, partly as at that stage the section between Wednesbury and Bilston was still in use, not closing until 1992. The Wednesbury to Birmingham section had closed back in 1972, and the section between Bilston and Wolverhampton was last used in 1983.

A Bill to give West Midlands Passenger Transport Executive powers to build the line was deposited in Parliament in November 1988, and became an Act of Parliament a year later, with completion expected by the mid 1990s.

A three-line network was initially planned, and powers were also obtained to build two further routes. Firstly an extension of Line 1 through the city centre to Five Ways, then a second line, Midland Metro Line 2, running to Chelmsley Wood, and then Birmingham Airport. A third line, Line 3 was also proposed, running from Line 1 at Wolverhampton to Walsall, using much of the disused trackbed of the Wolverhampton and Walsall Railway, and then, using the Wednesbury to Brierley Hill trackbed of the South Staffordshire Line (which would close in 1993), running southwards to Dudley intersecting with Line 1 along the route. This would provide a direct link with the new Merry Hill Shopping Centre, which was built between 1984 and 1989.

Some 25 years later, Line 2 and Line 3 have not been built. In 1997 Centro accepted that they were unable to get funding for the proposed lines, and therefore adopted a strategy of expanding the system in "bite-sized chunks", with the city-centre extension of Line 1 as the first priority. The intention was that the first decade of the 21st century would see the completion of the first of these projects.

Work on the Birmingham Metro tram extension began in June 2012, launched by transport minister Norman Baker. The dig was begun at the junction of Corporation Street and Bull Street, with work to move water pipes and power cables.

On Sunday 6 December 2015, trams entered service on the extension to Bull Street.

Construction of Line 1
A contract for the construction and operation of Line 1 was awarded to the Altram consortium in August 1995, and construction began three months later.

The estimated construction cost in 1995 was £145 million, of which loans and grants from central government accounted for £80M, the European Regional Development Fund contributed £31M, while the West Midlands Passenger Transport Authority provided £17.1M and Altram contributed £11.4M. The targeted completion date of August 1998 was missed by ten months, leading to compensation being paid by Altram. The original part of Line 1, Birmingham to Wolverhampton, was opened on 30 May 1999.

Current network

Route

For nearly two decades, Line 1 between Birmingham to Wolverhampton was the solitary operating section of the Midland Metro. It runs mostly along the trackbed of the former Great Western Railway line between the two cities which was closed in phases between 1972 and 1992. Originally, the line terminated at Birmingham Snow Hill station, using the space of one of the former rail platforms. However, in 2015–16, the line was extended across Birmingham city centre as far as Birmingham New Street station. From December 2019, trams terminated in Centenary Square at Birmingham Library, and in July 2022 the line was extended further to Edgbaston tram stop.

From the Grand Central tram stop, which allows interchange with the National Rail network at Birmingham New Street station, West Midlands Metro then runs on street through the city-centre to Birmingham Snow Hill station. From there, the line runs north-west, and for the first few miles it runs alongside the Birmingham to Worcester railway line, before the two diverge. Two stations on this stretch (Jewellery Quarter and The Hawthorns) are also tram/railway interchange stations.

At the northern end trams leave the railway trackbed at Priestfield to run along Bilston Road to St George's terminus in Bilston Street, Wolverhampton city centre. St George's has no direct interchange with rail services although frequent buses serve the stops outside the police station opposite. The railway station can be reached on foot in a few minutes via Pipers Row and footway at the northern end of the bus station.

The original proposal was to run into the former Wolverhampton Low Level station, giving the terminus a link to the very centre of Wolverhampton, but this was abandoned.

Stops

There are 31 tram stops in use on Line 1.

Frequencies
Mondays to Saturdays, services run at six to eight-minute intervals during the day. Evening and Sunday service is at fifteen-minute intervals. Trams take roughly 45 minutes to complete the route.

Rolling stock

Current fleet
West Midlands Metro operates 21 trams, with more on order. In summary:

In February 2012, Centro announced that it was planning a £44.2million replacement of the entire existing T-69 tram fleet. CAF was named preferred bidder for 19 to 25 Urbos 3 trams. A £40million order for 20 was signed, with options for five more. The new fleet provided an increased service of ten trams per hour in each direction, with an increased capacity of 210 passengers per tram (compared to 156 passengers on the T69 trams).

The first four new trams entered service on 5 September 2014; all of the T-69s had been replaced by August 2015.

In October 2019, WMCA awarded CAF a contract to supply an additional 21 Urbos 3 trams worth £83.5million for the expanding network, with the option to purchase a further 29. The contract includes technical support and battery management services over 30years.

Cracks were found in a couple of the new trams during routine inspection in June 2021 leading to all services being briefly suspended. Services were suspended again in November 2021 for four weeks as further inspections had discovered that more significant permanent repairs were required.

The service was suspended again on 20 March 2022 for replacement of body panels and recommenced on 9 June 2022.

Former fleet
West Midlands Metro has previously operated the following trams:

T-69
The T-69s were built in Italy by AnsaldoBreda (now Hitachi Rail Italy), and were used only on the Midland Metro (as it was called then).
After withdrawal, all sixteen were transferred to the tram test centre at Long Marston.  Most of the trams were sold for scrap, but four of them still remain at Long Marston.

Infrastructure

Track
Line 1 is a standard gauge double-track tramway. Trams are driven manually under a mix of line-of-sight and signals. Turnback crossovers along the line, including in the street section, have point indicators.

On the trackbed section Birmingham to Priestfield, signals are at Black Lake level crossing, Wednesbury Parkway, and Metro Centre. The street section has signals at every set of traffic lights, tied into the road signals to allow tram priority.

Tram stop design
The tram stops are unstaffed raised platforms with two open-fronted cantilever shelters equipped with seats, a 'live' digital display of services, closed circuit television, and an intercom linked to Metro Centre.

Power supply
Some of the line is electrified at 750 V DC using overhead lines, and that system was renewed in 2010/11, requiring short-term closures. Newer trams have batteries, and charge at specially adapted tram stops, eliminating the need for visible power infrastructure.

Depot
The Metro Centre control room, stabling point and depot is near Wednesbury Great Western Street tram stop, on land once used as railway sidings.

In January 2023, construction began to expand the depot.

Fares and ticketing
Unlike many other tram and train networks in the UK, West Midlands Metro does not offer ticket machines or ticket offices at tram stops although machines were provided when the system opened. They were later replaced by conductors. Single, return, and all-day tickets are sold by the on-tram conductors. Tickets valid for 1, 4, or 52 weeks are sold from seven "Travel Shops" located around the West Midlands, though only four are in locations served by the Metro.

Up until 2018 single, return, and day tickets could only be purchased with cash or Swift cards. Contactless payment cards are now accepted, though notes larger than £10 are not. Using a Swift card attracts a small discount, usually 10p.

Cash fares are distance-related. The scale was originally intended to be broadly comparable with buses, but this caused the system to run at a significant loss and fares rose. In January 2013 the adult single fare from Birmingham to Wolverhampton was £2 by bus and £3.60 by tram, although the tram journey is much quicker even when the bus routes are congestion-free. By 2016 the tram fare had risen to £4. In November 2013 Birmingham City Council indicated plans to introduce a smart-card system (similar to Transport for London's Oyster Card) to improve access, alongside a range of measures including a new Tube-style map and electric bus networks. This has now launched and is called the Swift card.

In March 2022, the fares system was amended again, with the graduated fares replaced by four Zones:
Zone 1 - Edgbaston Village to Jewellery Quarter (Birmingham City Zone)
Zone 2 - Jewellery Quarter to Black Lake
Zone 3 - Black Lake to Priestfield
Zone 4 - Priestfield to Wolverhampton St.George's (Wolverhampton City Zone)
Fares were now charged on a per-Zone basis, with fares payable for travel in Zone 1 slightly higher than Zones 2-4 (this applies to single Zone, two Zone and three Zone fares).  The stops at Jewellery Quarter, Black Lake and Priestfield are "Boundary Stations", meaning they sit in both Zones.

Corporate affairs

Operator
When the Midland Metro system opened in 1999, it was originally operated by Altram, a joint venture of the infrastructure company John Laing, the engineering firm Ansaldo, and the transport group National Express. In 2006, Ansaldo and Laing officially withdrew from the venture after financial difficulties, and day-to-day operation was taken over by the remaining partner, National Express, who ran the system as National Express Midland Metro.

In October 2018, the National Express concession ended and the system was taken over by Transport for West Midlands, the transport arm of the West Midlands Combined Authority (WMCA). Operation of Midland Metro was taken over by Midland Metro Ltd, a company wholly owned by WMCA, and the system was rebranded West Midlands Metro. WMCA subsequently set up a consortium of various engineering and consultancy firms, the Midland Metro Alliance, to design and construct future network extensions.

Business trends
The current operator, Midland Metro Ltd, has produced accounts from 1 October 2017. (Beforehand, between 1999 and 2003, Altram had operated Midland Metro unsuccessfully on a for-profit basis. However, operating revenue did not cover costs, and in February 2003, auditors refused to sign off Midland Metro's accounts as a going concern. From 2006, under National Express, losses were largely covered by cross-subsidy from other parts of the National Express group, but the figures were not shown separately in their published accounts.)

Passenger revenue and passenger numbers are published by the Department of Transport.

The key available trends in recent years for West Midlands Metro are (years ending 31 March):

Passenger numbers
Detailed passenger journeys since the system commenced operations on 30 May 1999 were:

Usage on the initial line averaged about five million passenger journeys annually, but numbers remained static for many years. This was not seen as successful, as 14 to 20 million passengers per year had been projected.

Numerous reasons were suggested for the underperformance, including: that the line has lacked visibility, being confined to Snow Hill station at the edge of Birmingham city centre; that there are quicker trains running between Birmingham and Wolverhampton; that the line did not serve New Street station or any of Birmingham's major visitor attractions (except for the Jewellery Quarter, already well-served by suburban trains). Nonetheless, overcrowding sometimes occurred on trams at peak hours.

Passenger numbers increased sharply following the opening of the extension into Birmingham city centre in June 2016, with figures for 2016/17 exceeding six million for the first time.

Branding and livery

The original Midland Metro branding consisted of a blue, green and red livery on tram vehicles with yellow doors. Upon the change to National Express operation in 2006, Midland Metro was rebranded with Network West Midlands livery, then a sub-brand of the transport authority Centro, and trams were painted in a magenta and silver livery with blue doors.

Since 2017, West Midlands Metro has adopted shared branding with other transport modes consisting of a common hexagonal logo formed from the letters WM. This common brand has been introduced in order to create a common identity for an integrated transport system for the region. Each mode bears a coloured variant of the logo: blue for trams, red for buses, orange for trains, magenta for roads, purple for taxis and green for cycling and walking initiatives. The primary typeface is LL Circular by Lineto.

Expansion plans
The Midland Metro Alliance was set up in 2017 by WMCA as a long-term framework agreement with transport contractors Colas Rail, Barhale, Thomas Vale, Auctus Management Group, Egis Rail, Tony Gee and Pell Frischman to design and construct future extensions of the West Midlands Metro system.

An extension of Line 1 through Birmingham city centre opened in phases in 2015, 2019 and 2022. An extension through Wolverhampton city centre is also in progress with the same opening date along with a new line from Wednesbury to Brierley Hill through Dudley Town Centre; this is scheduled to open in 2023.

Line 1 expansion

Birmingham City Centre extension

Until 2015, the southern end of the Metro line terminated at Snow Hill station, on the periphery of Birmingham city centre. From its inception, Midland Metro had failed to attain projected passenger numbers and to operate at a profit, and this was attributed to the fact that the line could not carry passengers all the way into the urban centre. The Birmingham City Centre Extension (BCCE) was conceived to solve this problem by extending Line 1 into the streets of central Birmingham. Originally it was planned to terminate the extension at Stephenson Street, adjacent to New Street railway station, but the plans were revised to continue the extension to Birmingham Library, and eventually as far as Five Ways. A Transport and Works Order authorising the BCCE was made in July 2005, and Government approval was given in February 2012. A new fleet of trams and a new depot at Wednesbury were also authorised, with a budget of £128million, of which £75million was to be funded by the Department for Transport (DfT). Extension works began in June 2012.

The extension of Line 1 is taking place in three phases:
 The Birmingham Westside extension will continue the line from Birmingham Library along Broad Street to Hagley Road in Edgbaston (just west of Five Ways).
This extension used a new route to the east of Snow Hill station which diverged from the original line along a new viaduct and descended to street level. The former tram terminus inside Snow Hill station was closed, releasing a fourth platform at Snow Hill to be reinstated for mainline railway use although , little work has been carried out at the former terminus. A temporary reversing spur was built in Stephenson Street to allow trams to turn back for the return journey to Wolverhampton. On 19 November 2015, The Queen visited Birmingham and named one of the new trams. despite only being in use for five years, this track and the concrete trackbed was removed pending replacement, from May 2021.
 The extension from Grand Central to Centenary Square began on 5 September 2017. and was opened to passenger service in December 2019. Trams now run from Stephenson Street along Pinfold Street, through Victoria Square with a new stop at Town Hall, along Paradise Street and Broad Street, and terminated at Birmingham Library in Centenary Square until 16 July 2022.
 A further extension from Birmingham Library to Edgbaston along Broad Street opened on 17 July 2022.

Wolverhampton City Centre loop
The northern part of the Line 1 extension scheme is the addition of a tram line into Wolverhampton city centre. The laying of the new track was completed in December 2019 and it is anticipated that passenger services will commence in 2021 once the renovation of Wolverhampton railway station has been completed.

It was originally proposed in 2009 as a single-track loop running clockwise from the existing St George's terminus via Princess Street, Lichfield Street and Pipers Row (for Wolverhampton bus station), with a spur to Wolverhampton railway station. The scheme had an estimated cost of £30million. In 2010 Centro considered revised proposals that involved an extended route along part of the Wolverhampton Ring Road, serving the University of Wolverhampton campus. The original loop scheme was selected and in 2012 Centro decided to proceed by constructing it in phases. A Transport and Works Act Order was approved in 2016, and in March 2014, a £2billion connectivity funding package was announced to support a number of transport projects, including phase 1 of the Wolverhampton extension.

The first phase will see the construction of the eastern section of the Wolverhampton loop, consisting of a line branching off before the existing St. George's terminus and running north up Piper's Row to terminate at the railway station. Northbound trams will terminate alternately at the station and at St George's. The estimated completion date was 2015, although a succession of delays means that  this section is scheduled to open in spring 2023. The remaining part of the Wolverhampton loop will be completed at a later date, subject to funding.

Line 2
West Midlands Metro is being extended through the construction of two new lines.

Eastside extension

In February 2014, it was announced that funding had been secured for the first phase of the Line 2 Eastside extension as far as Curzon Street, before a terminus at Adderley Street.

The new Line 2 will branch off from Line 1 at a junction at meeting point of Bull St and Corporation St. In 2014, Centro considered two proposed routes, one running via Bull Street and Carrs Lane and serving Moor Street station, and a more direct route via Bull Street and Albert Street, bypassing Moor Street.

A Transport and Works Act application was submitted by the Metro Alliance for the first phase of the Line 2 Eastside extension, following the route via Albert Street and Curzon Street and terminating at Digbeth.

Construction of the Eastside extension, including a new tramway junction at Lower Bull St and Corporation St, began in June 2021. The first phase of the works involved utility upgrades and diversions in the area. The closure of Lower Bull street is expected to be in place until Spring 2022. During works, trams from Wolverhampton are terminating at Upper Bull Street, with no service to Grand Central or beyond.

Wednesbury–Brierley Hill extension

The route would be constructed on the track bed of the disused South Staffordshire Line, running through Tipton and close to the former Dudley Town station. The line would then run on-street into Dudley town centre, before following the A461 Southern Bypass to rejoin the railway corridor. After running along part of the former Oxford, Worcester and Wolverhampton Line, the tram line would diverge south to serve the Waterfront Business Park and Merry Hill Shopping Centre, terminating at Brierley Hill. In 2012, the estimated cost of the WBHE was £268million, and a frequency of ten trams per hour was envisaged, alternately serving Wolverhampton and Birmingham. A further extension to Stourbridge has also been proposed, with a junction at Canal Street, allowing trams to access the remainder of the Oxford, Worcester and Wolverhampton Line to Stourbridge Junction and possibly Stourbridge Town.

Network Rail have announced plans to reopen the South Staffordshire Line for the use of freight trains. Metro planners considered operating light rail trams on segregated tracks, but in 2011 put forward proposals to introduce tram-train operation on the route to allow Metro vehicles to share tracks with heavy rail freight trains.

Due to funding constraints, it was decided to construct Line 2 in phases, with the first section from Wednesbury to Dudley opening first.

In early 2017, work began to clear vegetation and disused track from the former railway line. And in early 2021, work started on construction of the line It is estimated that the entire line to Brierley Hill will be completed by 2023. The estimated cost of Line 2 is now £449million. In July 2022, it was revealed that due to spiralling costs, the line to Brierley Hill will be built in two phases. Phase 1 will see a line open to Dudley, construction of which is well underway. Subject to further funding, Phase 2 will extend the line to Brierley Hill.

Other new lines
In September 2021, £2.1billion in funding was applied for, of which £1billion was received, for new Metro and upgraded bus routes around the West Midlands, consisting of many new lines and extensions, these are:
 Extension from Edgbaston to Quinton
 This may be cut or extended depending on how much funding is given
 Extension from Brierley Hill to Stourbridge Junction
 New Line from Walsall to Wednesbury (offering two routes to Birmingham)
 New Line to New Cross Hospital
 This would likely be an extension of the line to Wolverhampton Railway Station currently under construction. 
 Possible New Line branching off the Airport Line to Solihull Town Centre

Historic planned extensions
In 2004, the proposed Phase Two expansion included five routes:

Birmingham City Centre to Great Barr
A , 17-stop route from the city centre through Lancaster Circus and along the A34 corridor to the Birmingham/Walsall boundary, terminating near the M6 motorway junction 7. Transport for the West Midlands have since decided that a "West Midlands Sprint" concept, based on bus rapid transit is the way forward for this route.

Birmingham City Centre to Quinton
A  route from the BCCE terminus at Five Ways along the Hagley Road to Quinton.

Wolverhampton City Centre to Wednesfield, Willenhall, Walsall and Wednesbury
This  "5Ws" route would connect Wolverhampton city centre to Wednesfield, Willenhall, Walsall and Wednesbury, and provide direct access to New Cross and Manor Hospitals, partially using the trackbed of the former Wolverhampton and Walsall Railway. This link was officially declared dead in the Express & Star on 23 October 2015. In place of this line, restoration of passenger services along the railway line between Wolverhampton and Walsall including new stations at Willenhall and Darlaston (James Bridge) was proposed.

Birmingham City Centre to Birmingham Airport
(A45)- A  route from Birmingham Airport/ National Exhibition Centre and serving suburbs along the A45 road. Journey time from central Birmingham (Bull Street) to the airport was estimated at 29minutes. This proposal has now been incorporated into the proposals for Line 2.

(A47)- In September 2010, the Birmingham Post reported that a "£425million rapid transit system" between Birmingham city centre and the airport "could involve a new light rail scheme". Centro strategy director Alex Burrows stated "the Birmingham City Centre to Birmingham Airport Rapid Transit plan will deliver connectivity between the city centre, Birmingham Business Park and Chelmsley Wood".

In 2004–05, Birmingham City Council also evaluated the possibility of constructing an underground railway, and the scheme was advocated by the leader of the council, Mike Whitby, and deputy leader of the council, Paul Tilsley. A feasibility report by Jacobs Engineering and Deloitte concluded that the tunnelling scheme would be unaffordable and not meet government funding criteria.

Accidents and incidents
 On 8 June 2006, T-69 tram, fleet number 06, collided with a taxi on New Swan Lane Level Crossing. The taxi was pushed across the junction and collided with a stationary lorry. The two occupants of the taxi were taken to hospital and released after two hours; neither the tram passengers nor the lorry driver suffered any injuries. The RAIB enquiry found that the tram driver failed to stop at the signal; the report noted that this was then the only level crossing on the network, and that there had been seven previous collisions there since the metro came into operation in 1999, but all of these had been a result of failures by road traffic users.
 On 19 December 2006, trams 09 and 10 collided in Winson Green, injuring a group of people while en route to the Metro's then Birmingham Snow Hill terminus.
 On 19 August 2019, tram 31 was derailed after colliding with a vehicle in Wolverhampton.
 On 13 November 2021, services were suspended due to cracks being found in the bodywork of some trams.
 On 20 March 2022, services were suspended until further notice due to cracks in the bodywork of some older trams.

See also
 Coventry Very Light Rail - planned light rail system in Coventry

References

Bibliography

Further reading

External links

 

 
Electric railways in the United Kingdom
Light rail in the United Kingdom
Tram transport in England
Transport in Birmingham, West Midlands
Transport in Wolverhampton
750 V DC railway electrification
Railway lines opened in 1999
Proposed railway lines in England
1999 establishments in England